Ar Rajma, Er Rajma, or Er Regima is a village in eastern Libya.

Ar Rajma escarpment, the closest of Jebel Akhdar's escarpments to Benghazi, was named after this village.

Notes

Populated places in Marj District